The 1999 Czech Figure Skating Championships were held in Karviná between December 17 and 20, 1998. Skaters competed in the disciplines of men's singles, ladies' singles, pair skating, and ice dancing.

Results

Men

Ladies

Pairs

Ice dancing

External links
 results

1998 in figure skating
Czech Figure Skating Championships, 1999
Czech Figure Skating Championships
1999 in Czech sport